Stemettes is a social enterprise which encourages girls and young women aged 5–25 to pursue careers in Science, Technology, Engineering, and Maths (STEM). Stemettes runs panel events, hackathons, the Student to Stemette mentoring programme supported by Deutsche Bank, Outbox Incubator and an app, OtotheB, an online platform for girls interested in STEM and entrepreneurship.

History
Stemettes was started in 2013 by British mathematics and computing child prodigy Anne-Marie Imafidon. In 2015, Jacquelyn Guderley became co-founder of Stemettes alongside Imafidon.

Stemettes has partnered with organisations including Deutsche Bank, Salesforce, Accenture, Bank of America Merrill Lynch, BP and Microsoft. The organisation is regularly called upon by the UK Government and European Commission to consult on matters related to women in STEM.

Outbox Incubator
For six weeks from July–August 2015, Stemettes ran Outbox Incubator in London. This residential business incubator for girls with STEM start-ups became known as the "X-men house for girls".

In February 2016, the Outbox Incubator spin-off app, OtotheB, was officially launched. The app is an online platform for girls interested in STEM and entrepreneurship. The app has been well received by some STEM figures such as academic and campaigner Sue Black, who described the app as a "…fantastic new resource for young women interested in technology".

Awards and recognition
Stemettes was named as European Digital Impact Organisation of the Year in October 2014 by the Digital Leadership Institute.

References

External links
 Stemettes website
 Outbox Incubator website
 Student to Stemette website
 OtotheB website

Social enterprises
Women in technology
Computer science education
Diversity in computing
Women and science
Organizations for women in science and technology
Digital divide